Lena Stigrot (born 21 December 1994) is a German volleyball player, playing as an outside-spiker. She is part of the Germany women's national volleyball team.

She competed at the 2015 FIVB Volleyball World Grand Prix, and at the 2015 European Games, 2015 Women's European Volleyball Championship. and 2019 Montreux Volley Masters.
On club level she plays for Raben Vilsbiburg.

References

External links
https://web.archive.org/web/20170423021656/http://www.roteraben.de/spielerin/lena-stigrot/
http://www.scoresway.com/?sport=volleyball&page=player&id=3079

1994 births
Living people
German women's volleyball players
People from Bad Tölz
Sportspeople from Upper Bavaria
Volleyball players at the 2015 European Games
European Games competitors for Germany